The Norway men's national pitch and putt team represents Norway in the pitch and putt international competitions. It is managed by the Norges Pitch & Putt Forbund (NPPF).

"Norges Pitch & Putt Forbund" is member of the European Pitch and Putt Association, and one of the founders of the Federation of International Pitch and Putt Associations (FIPPA) in 2006.

Norway reached the 4th place in the 2004 Pitch and putt World Cup and the 6th place in the 2007 and 2010 European Championships.

National team

Players
National team in the European Championship 2010:
Bernt K. Nerland
Anders C. Juel
Jan Vingen
Knut Henrik Lie
Kenneth Vika
Anders Olsen

National team in the World Cup 2008:
Anders Olsen
Toni Ede
Jan Andersen

National team in the European Championship 2007:
Anders Chr. Juel
Anders Olsen
Torbjorn S.B. Johansen
Leif Morten Hagen
Edvard Hatle
Pal Andre Haugan

See also
World Cup Team Championship
European Team Championship

External links
NPPF Norges Pitch & Putt Forbund
FIPPA Federation of International Pitch and Putt Associations website
EPPA European Pitch and Putt Association website

National pitch and putt teams
Pitch and putt